Central Heights Independent School District is a public school district in north-central Nacogdoches County, Texas (USA).

In 2009, it was rated "recognized" by the Texas Education Agency.

Schools
Central Heights High/Junior High (Grades 6-12) 
Central Heights Elementary (Grades PK-5)
(Both located on one campus.)

References

External links
Central Heights ISD

School districts in Nacogdoches County, Texas